Ali Nazmi (pen name of Ali Mammadzadeh (Əli Məmmədzadə), 1878, Sarov–January 1, 1946, Baku) was an Azerbaijani poet, a representative of the 20th-century Azerbaijani realism and successor of Mirza Alakbar Sabir. Nazmi was the first translator of Shakespeare's King Lear into Azerbaijani.

Nazmi's first poem A Start to the Village was published in 1904. In 1926-1931 Nazmi was a secretary of Molla Nasraddin magazine. During the Soviet-German War he wrote several satires: Hitler's Union with Devil, Wolf's Protest Against God, My Homeland and others. Nazmi strived for the purity of Azerbaijani language against Pan-Turkists and Panislamists.

Notes

Works
Sijimqulunamə (Sijimguluname), Baku, 1927
Seçilmiş əsərləri (Selected Works), Baku, 1959
Şerlər (Poems), Baku, 1963

1878 births
1946 deaths
Azerbaijani poets
Azerbaijani translators
Azerbaijani satirists
Poets from the Russian Empire
Soviet poets